Grantia is a genus of calcareous sponges belonging to the family Grantiidae. Species of the genus Grantia contain spicules and spongin fibers.

The genus contains bioluminescent species.

Species list
 Grantia aculeata Urban, 1908
 Grantia arctica (Haeckel, 1872)
 Grantia atlantica Ridley, 1881
 Grantia beringiana Hôzawa, 1918
 Grantia canadensis Lambe, 1896
 Grantia capillosa (Schmidt, 1862)
 Grantia comoxensis Lambe, 1893
 Grantia compressa (Fabricius, 1780)
 Grantia cupula (Haeckel, 1872)
 Grantia extusarticulata (Carter, 1886)
 Grantia fistulata Carter, 1886
 Grantia foliacea Breitfuss, 1898
 Grantia genuina Row & Hôzawa, 1931
 Grantia glabra Hôzawa, 1933
 Grantia harai Hôzawa, 1929
 Grantia hirsuta (Topsent, 1907)
 Grantia indica Dendy, 1913
 Grantia infrequens (Carter, 1886)
 Grantia intermedia Thacker, 1908
 Grantia invenusta Lambe, 1900
 Grantia kempfi Borojevic & Peixinho, 1976
 Grantia kujiensis Hôzawa, 1933
 Grantia laevigata (Haeckel, 1872)
 Grantia mexico Hôzawa, 1940
 Grantia mirabilis (Fristedt, 1887)
 Grantia monstruosa Breitfuss, 1898
 Grantia nipponica Hôzawa, 1918
 Grantia phillipsi Lambe, 1900
 Grantia primitiva Brøndsted, 1927
 Grantia ramulosa Dendy, 1924
 Grantia scottia (Jenkin, 1908)
 Grantia singularis (Breitfuss, 1898)
 Grantia socialis Borojevic, 1967
 Grantia strobilus (Haeckel, 1872)
 Grantia stylata Hôzawa, 1929
 Grantia tenuis Urban, 1908
 Grantia transgrediens Brøndsted, 1931
 Grantia tuberosa Poléjaeff, 1883
 Grantia uchidai Hôzawa & Tanita, 1941
 Grantia vosmaeri Dendy, 1893

References

Taxonomicon
North East Atlantic Taxa

Leucosolenida
Sponge genera
Bioluminescent animals